Navdeep Singh (born 21 February 1986) is an Indian former professional tennis player.

Singh, who was born in New Delhi and raised in Dubai, had a ranking of 63 on the ITF junior circuit, with appearances in junior grand slam tournaments.

On the professional tour, Singh featured in one ATP Tour main draw, as a qualifier at the 2007 Kingfisher Airlines Tennis Open in Mumbai, where he lost in the first round to Toshihide Matsui. He won five ITF Futures doubles titles.

ITF Futures titles

Doubles: (5)

References

External links
 
 

1986 births
Living people
Indian male tennis players
People from New Delhi
Racket sportspeople from Delhi
Indian expatriate sportspeople in the United Arab Emirates
Sportspeople from Dubai